The Anglican Church of St Mary at Edgeworth in the Cotswold District of Gloucestershire, England was built in 11th century. It is a grade I listed building.

History

The building was originally Saxon but has been revised and expanded many times. In the 12th century the chancel was added and the tower in the 14th.

A major Victorian restoration removed some of the Romanesque architecture in the interior of the church.

Several species of bats have been identified in the church.

Architecture

The limestone building has stone slate roofs. It consists of a nave, chancel, south porch and west tower. The tower has a sundial and many gargoyles and grotesques.

Most of the internal furnishing is from the 19th century but there is a font and some of the bench ends which are from the 15th century. There are also some remnants of 14th century stained glass.

References

Church of England church buildings in Gloucestershire
Grade I listed churches in Gloucestershire